Religion in North America is dominated by various branches of Christianity and spans the period of Native American dwelling, European settlement, and the present day. Religion has been a major influence on art, culture, philosophy and law of the continent.

Between them, the United States, Mexico and Canada account for 85 percent of the population of North America. Religion in each of these countries is dominated by Christianity (77.4), making it the largest religious group in North America.

By religion

Judaism

North America: 1.5%
United States: 1.7% to 2.9%
Canada: 1.2%
Mexico: 0.02%

Christianity

North America: 75.2%-77.4%
Mexico: 87.7%
United States: 73.7%
Canada: 67.3%

Islam

Canada: 4.9%
United States: 1.2%
Mexico: 0.2%

Buddhism 

Canada: 1.4%
Mexico: 0.1%
United States: 0.9%

Hinduism 

Canada: 2.3%
United States: 1.0%
Mexico: 0.09%

Sikhism 

Canada: 2.1%
United States: 0.2%

Bahá'í Faith 

United States: 0.2%
Canada: 0.1%
Mexico: <0.1%

Irreligion 
Canada: 29% 
United States: 28%
Mexico: 4.6%

By country

Canada

Mexico

United States

See also

 Catholic Church in North America
 Eastern Orthodoxy in North America
 Oriental Orthodoxy in North America
 Religion in South America

References

Sources